The 2009 season was Seongnam Ilhwa Chunma's twenty-first season in the K-League in South Korea. Seongnam Ilhwa Chunma competed in K-League, League Cup and Korean FA Cup.

Current squad

Match results

K-League
NB: 3 & 17 round were rest rounds.

League table

Results summary

Results by round

Championship Play-offs

Korean FA Cup

League Cup

Peace Cup

Squad statistics
Statistics accurate as of match played 6 December 2009

Transfer

In
 22 October 2009 –  Kim Yong-Dae – Gwangju Sangmu FC
 22 October 2009 –  Kim Tae-Yoon – Gwangju Sangmu FC
 22 October 2009 –  Shin Dong-Keun – Gwangju Sangmu FC
 22 October 2009 –  Park Kwang-Min – Gwangju Sangmu FC

Out
 December 2008 –  Kim Hae-Woon – retired
 12 January 2009 –  Lee Dong-Gook – Jeonbuk Hyundai Motors
 12 January 2009 –  Kim Sang-Sik – Jeonbuk Hyundai Motors
 12 January 2009 –  Son Dae-Ho – Incheon United
 19 January 2009 –  Kim Young-chul – Chunnam Dragons
 January 2009 –  Park Jae-Yong – Ulsan Hyundai FC
 January 2009 –  Kim Dong-hyun – Gyeongnam FC
 January 2009 –  Lee Won-Hee – Free Agent
 2 March 2009 –  Park Jin-Seop – Busan I'Park
 22 June 2009 –  Mota – Contract canceled
 26 June 2009 –  Lee Hyung-Sang – Banik Ostrava
 12 July 2009 –  Ou Kyoung-Jun – FC Metz (loan end)

References

Seongnam Ilhwa Chunma
2009